Marta Dzido (born 1981) is a Polish writer and documentary filmmaker. She studied at the Polish Film School in Łódź and has shot and directed a number of documentaries, among them the award-winning Downtown (2010) and Solidarity According to Women (2014). The movie commemorated the forgotten role of the Polish female activists engaged in the anti-Communist opposition during the 1980s.

She has also written several novels and a non-fiction book Women of Solidarity (2016). She won the European Union Prize for Literature for her novel Frajda (2018).

References

Polish writers
1981 births
Living people